Tuertella is a monotypic moth genus of the family Noctuidae erected by Sergius G. Kiriakoff in 1977. Its only species, Tuertella rema, was first described by Herbert Druce in 1910. It is found in Burundi, Tanzania and Zambia.

References

Agaristinae
Monotypic moth genera